Major-General Sir George Townshend Forestier-Walker KCB (2 August 1866 – 23 January 1939) was a senior British Army officer during World War I.

Early life and education
Forestier-Walker was born in Camberley, the third son of Major-General George Edmund Lushington Walker and Camilla Georgina Calder, only daughter of Major-General J. Patrick Calder. The grandson of Sir George Townshend Walker, 1st Baronet, he was from an illustrious military family. He was educated at Rugby School and the Royal Military Academy, Woolwich.

Military career

Forestier-Walker was commissioned into the Royal Artillery in 1884 and served as Deputy Assistant Adjutant General during the Second Boer War. He became Chief Staff Officer of the Somaliland Field Force in 1902, Assistant Quartermaster General for Intelligence for the Somaliland Field Force in 1903 and saw action again during the East Africa Campaign before becoming Assistant Quartermaster General at Southern Command in 1910. He went on to be brigadier-general on the General Staff of Irish Command in 1912.

Forestier-Walker served in World War I initially as Chief of Staff of II Corps, which went to France with the British Expeditionary Force. He became General Officer Commanding 21st Division in April 1915 and fought at the battle of Loos in September 1915. He went on to command the 63rd (2nd Northumbrian) Division in the Home Forces from February 1916 and to command the 65th (2nd Lowland) Division from September 1916 also in the Home Forces. In December 1916 he became General Officer Commanding 27th Division serving as part of the British Salonika Army and eventually, after the Armistice of Mudros, at Tiflis in Georgia. He retired in 1920 and became Colonel Commandant of the Royal Artillery in 1931.

Personal life
In 1892, he married Lady Mary Maud Diana Liddell, daughter of Henry Liddell, 2nd Earl of Ravensworth. They had two sons, both of whom died young, and two daughters:

 Lilian Diana Forestier Walker (12 January 1894 – 5 August 1922)
 George Forestier Walker (born and died 31 May 1898) 
 Helen Mary Cecilia Forestier-Walker (17 April 1895 – 28 July 1987)
 Cortlandt Simon Michael Forestier Walker (20 November 1902 – 29 August 1903)

He died at Child Okeford, Blandford, aged 72.

References

|-

1866 births
1939 deaths
People from Camberley
British Army generals of World War I
Knights Commander of the Order of the Bath
People educated at Rugby School
Military personnel from Surrey
British Army major generals
Royal Artillery officers
British Army personnel of the Second Boer War
Graduates of the Royal Military Academy, Woolwich